Oneyama Eke  is a Nigerian footballer who plays as a forward for ONGC F.C. in the I-League.

Career

ONGC
On 17 September 2012 it was confirmed officially that Eke had signed with newly promoted ONGC F.C. of the I-League, their first I-League season since relegation in 2011. On 21 September 2012 Eke made his debut for ONGC during the 2012 Indian Federation Cup against Kalighat MS at the Kanchenjunga Stadium in Siliguri and he scored twice in that match as ONGC won 5–1. He then played his second game for ONGC on 23 September 2012 against East Bengal F.C. in the Federation Cup but he could not score as ONGC lost 2–1.

Career statistics

Club
Statistics accurate as of 23 December 2012

References

Nigerian footballers
Living people
I-League players
ONGC FC players
1983 births
Nigerian expatriate footballers
Nigerian expatriate sportspeople in India
Expatriate footballers in India
Association football forwards